Dar-e-Arqam schools system (Urdu: دارارقم سکولز ) is one of the private school systems in Pakistan. The first branch of this school system was inaugurated in Sargodha in 1991. Thereafter gradually, the school group educates more than 200,000 students and has more than 700+ branches in 150 cities across the Pakistan .

References 

School systems in Pakistan
Private schools in Pakistan
Islamic schools in Pakistan